Jamia Mosque is a mosque located on Banda Street, Nairobi, Kenya in the Central Business District. Jamia Mosque is an important center of Islamic practice in the East and Central African region. As a landmark and heritage site at the heart of Nairobi’s CBD, Jamia Mosque-Nairobi displays an iconic image and an architectural masterpiece. Founded by Syed Maulana Abdullah Shah in the year 1902 and constructed between 1925 and 1933, Jamia Mosque became the center of Muslim religious organization throughout the pre-independent and independent years.

The mosque plays a central role to Nairobi’s large Muslim population as a location of choice for Muslims for the Friday prayers. Throughout the 90s and the 21st century Jamia has become the place where Muslim religious, political and opinion leaders meet to discuss the affairs of the ummah. In many ways Jamia Mosque’s story echoes the story of Islam in Kenya; a story of determination for identity within a mosaic of multiplicity. Jamia Mosque was extended into a modern wing in 1998 and currently houses a large modern library facility, a Multi-Purpose Hall, a weekly newsletter (The Friday Bulletin) and a television station- Horizon TV. Our Vocational College –Jamia Training institute (JTI) previously situated at Jamia mosque complex was moved to Jamia Towers to provide additional office space for Jamia mosque and Horizon TV marketing.

The Jamia Mosque retains a classic Arabic Islamic architectural style with extensive use of marble and inscriptions from the Quran, and the traditional row of shops (including a clinic and pharmacy) down one side to provide rental income for its upkeep. It is recognisable by its three silver domes, and twin minarets. It contains a library and a training institute where one can learn Arabic, introductory computing and cloth making.

Website
Jamia Mosque Nairobi Official Website

References

Mosques in Kenya
Religious buildings and structures in Nairobi
Mosques completed in 1906
1906 establishments in the British Empire